"My Destiny" is a pop song performed by American Idol season 5 contestant Katharine McPhee and written by Harry Sommerdahl, Hanne Sørvaag, and Tim Baxter. McPhee first performed the song on the penultimate episode on May 23, 2006 at the Kodak Theatre.

The lyrics are about her destiny—to be with the one she loves and how she finds it difficult to believe that everything that she had always dreamt of is actually happening to her.

It was released as a CD single on June 27, 2006, with a cover of Eva Cassidy's unique 1996 version of "Somewhere Over the Rainbow" as the B-side. McPhee's rendition of "Somewhere Over the Rainbow" was originally performed during the top 3 finalists' judge's choice round, chosen by Simon Cowell. McPhee performed sitting on the stage and wearing red shoes. She sang the little-known opening verse a cappella. The judges had high praise for McPhee's performance, and it is believed that the song was responsible for vaulting her into the season's final two. Several critics, including Cowell, consider McPhee's performance to be the best of the entire series.  McPhee reprised her performance of the song in the final performance show on May 23. Her version again received rave reviews.

She also performed "Black Horse and the Cherry Tree" a second time, though her title was not released as a single. When McPhee's record deal was officially announced on June 6, 2006, RCA Records announced that "Somewhere Over the Rainbow/My Destiny" would be considered a double A-side, meaning that radio stations could have the option of playing either song. This reflects the fact that McPhee's rendition of "Somewhere Over the Rainbow" has become her signature performance, just as it was for Eva Cassidy.

On June 20, 2006, McPhee's upcoming single was added on the iTunes Music Store, later being removed on June 24. It was made available again on June 27.

Track listing
"Somewhere Over the Rainbow" - 3:30
"My Destiny" - 3:47

Charts
"Somewhere Over the Rainbow/My Destiny"

"My Destiny"

"Somewhere Over the Rainbow"

References

2006 songs
2006 debut singles
Katharine McPhee songs
American Idol songs
Songs written by Hanne Sørvaag
Songs written by Harry Sommerdahl
RCA Records singles